Vibroacoustic therapy (VAT) is a type of sound therapy that involves passing low frequency sine wave vibrations into the body via a device with embedded speakers. This therapy was developed in Norway by Olav Skille in the 1980s. The Food and Drug Administration determined that vibroacoustic devices, such as the Next Wave® PhysioAcoustic therapeutic vibrator, are "substantially equivalent" to other therapeutic vibrators, which are  "intended for various uses, such as relaxing muscles and relieving minor aches and pains"; thus, vibroacoustic devices (therapeutic vibrators) are "exempt from clinical investigations, Good Guidance Practices (GGPs), and premarket notification and approval procedures."

Benefits

Circulation
Low frequency (<30 Hz) whole body vibrations of restricted energy levels showed improvements in circulation.

Frequencies
Vibroacoustic therapy uses low frequency sinusoidal vibrations between 30 and 120Hz. This is similar to the range of subwoofers or vibrating theater seating. 40 Hz specifically has been widely studied in vibroacoustic therapy and a number of fields as well.

Devices
Vibroacoustic devices come in a range of forms including beds, chairs, pillows, mats, wristbands, wearable backpacks, and simple DIY platforms. They generally function by playing sound files through transducers, bass shakers, or exciters which then transfer the vibrations into the body. Some devices attempt to target very specific parts of the body such as the wrist or the spine.

Proposed mechanisms of action
One of the proposed mechanisms of action for vibroacoustic therapy is brainwave entrainment. Entrainment suggests that brainwaves will synchronize with rhythms from sensory input. This further suggests that some brainwave frequencies are preferable to others in given situations.

Current practice
Vibroacoustic therapy is available at a number of spas, resorts, and clinics around the world.

Related therapies
Vibroacoustic Therapy is closely related to Physio Acoustic Therapy (PAT) which was developed by Petri Lehikoinen in Finland. Both are examples of low frequency sound stimulation (LFSS). More broadly, they are subsets of Rhythmic Sensory Stimulation (RSS) which is being studied across a range of sensory modalities.

Criticism
The science behind vibroacoustic therapy has been questioned by multiple sources. Some sources refer to it as pseudoscience and the TedX talk by prominent vibroacoustic researcher Lee Bartel has been tagged as falling outside of the TED talk guidelines. Practitioners of VAT do agree that more research is needed as VAT has been a largely clinical practice since its inception. Academic research published in peer reviewed journals and meeting higher scientific standards is being pursued at the University of Toronto and other institutions to address these objections.

References 

Music therapy
Wave mechanics